The Center for Excellence in Higher Education (CEHE) was a Utah-based company that owned and managed Independence University, CollegeAmerica, Stevens-Henager College, and California College San Diego before their abrupt closings in August 2021. The company was a nonprofit organization. CEHE's colleges were  accredited by the Accrediting Commission of Career Schools and Colleges (ACCSC). The colleges were placed on probation in September 2018 due to ACCSC's concerns that "the inputs, resources, and processes of CEHE schools are designed and implemented in a manner that is not designed for student success." CEHE was also the lender to National American University.

History

The Center for Excellence in Education (CEHE) was founded by Carl Barney, a wealthy businessman and promoter of Ayn Rand. Debbi Potts, a former CEHE campus director, was attributed with bringing the organization's allegedly corrupt business practices to the attention of government regulators. In 2020, Mr. Barney was fined $3 million by the State of Colorado for defrauding students. In May 2021, CEO Eric Juhlin resigned after being suspended from contracting with the US government. By early August 2021 all CEHE campuses were closed.

Philosophy

The Center for Excellence in Higher Education supported free-market ideas in higher education. Its stated purpose was "to educate the public about the state of higher education in America and help donors promote excellence in higher education through philanthropy". CEHE had as an area of particular focus of ensuring that gifts to universities and colleges were used in accordance with the intent of the donors. It also supported efforts directed at the structural reform of higher education. It received its initial funding from the Marcus Foundation, the John Templeton Foundation, and the John William Pope Foundation.

References

External links
 Official website
 The End of Barney’s Second Career

Higher education in the United States
Educational organizations based in the United States